Mecynidis is a genus of African dwarf spiders that was first described by Eugène Louis Simon in 1894. Originally placed with the tangle-web spiders, it was moved to the Linyphiidae in 1964.

Species
 it contains eight species, found in Angola, Kenya, South Africa, and Tanzania:
Mecynidis antiqua Jocqué & Scharff, 1986 – Tanzania
Mecynidis ascia Scharff, 1990 – Tanzania
Mecynidis bitumida Russell-Smith & Jocqué, 1986 – Kenya
Mecynidis dentipalpis Simon, 1894 (type) – South Africa
Mecynidis laevitarsis Miller, 1970 – Angola
Mecynidis muthaiga Russell-Smith & Jocqué, 1986 – Kenya
Mecynidis scutata Jocqué & Scharff, 1986 – Tanzania
Mecynidis spiralis Jocqué & Scharff, 1986 – Tanzania

See also
 List of Linyphiidae species (I–P)

References

Araneomorphae genera
Linyphiidae
Spiders of Africa